Fairfax Academy (formerly Fairfax School) is a secondary school with academy status in the Royal Town of Sutton Coldfield, in north  Birmingham. The school was established in 1959. The school has a sixth-form, with a new sixth-form centre which opened in September 2013.

History 
The School opened in 1959; the founding Headmaster was Mr G Philpott. He was followed by Don Field. The School became a grant maintained, under the headship of Mr Richard Metcalfe,  it then transitioned to become a foundation school under the School Standards and Framework Act 1998. The School converted to become an Academy (English school) on 1 July 2011 under the headship of Mrs S Calvert. Calvert had been appointed headteacher in September 2006, and left in December 2011.

Mr A Bird was appointed as headteacher from the start of the Spring Term 2011/12. On 1 November 2014 Fairfax School became part of the Fairfax Multi Academy Trust; Mr Bird became the Executive Head and Deborah Bunn was Headteacher. The school was later renamed Fairfax Academy. Bournville School, Smith's Wood Academy and Erdington Academy are also a member of the Fairfax Multi-Academy Trust.

School performance

As of 2022, the school's most recent inspection by Ofsted was in 2019, a short inspection with a judgement of Good.

Notable alumni 

 Tobias Churton, scholar of Rosicrucianism, Freemasonry, Gnosticism and other esoteric movements
 Myles Edwards, rugby union player
 Nigel Pulsford, musician, and original guitarist with Bush)

References

External links
Fairfax Academy Website
School league table Birmingham City Council

Academies in Birmingham, West Midlands
Sutton Coldfield
Secondary schools in Birmingham, West Midlands
1959 establishments in the United Kingdom